KakaoPage is a monetized content platform optimized for mobile devices, launched by the Kakao Corp. in 2013 and currently owned by its subsidiary Kakao Entertainment. The service launched on April 9, 2013 as a digital content marketplace allowing brands and individuals to create and distribute visual, audio and written content such as manhwa and genre fiction. It entered the Indonesian market in 2018 and Taiwan in 2020.

KakaoPage is famous in South Korea for its "free if you wait" system that allows readers to view one episode of a webtoon or web novel for free if they wait for a certain amount of time after reading.

History
The service's then-operator, Podotree Co., Ltd. (changed name to KakaoPage Corp. in 2018), was founded on July 20, 2010 as a subsidiary of Kakao.

KakaoPage was deemed a failure by mid-2013, but after adding Legendary Moonlight Sculptor and several other popular works, the service bounced back. By April 21, 2014, they started their free webtoon and web fiction service. In 2014, they announced that they would add over a 100 different webtoon series before the year was out.

Any individual can create content and upload it to KakaoPage and sell it directly to other consumers on the platform. The total revenue for any sale is distributed as, 30% to Google Play, 20% to Kakao and remaining 50% to the publisher.

By September 2019, KakaoPage recorded over 66,000 contents in total and 22 million accumulated number of members.

Investments
KakaoPage Corp. owned 19.8 percent of Haksan Publishing, 22.2 percent of Seoul Media Comics and 19.8 percent of Daewon C.I., all of them publishers of comics. It also owned 21.9 percent of stocks in drama production company Mega Monster, which is a subsidiary of its then-sister company Kakao M.

In 2018, the company acquired Neobazar, Indonesia's top webtoon platform company, for 13.8 billion won.

In July 2020, KakaoPage invested in the US-based web-novel platform Radish, for 32.2 billion won.

In August 2020, KakaoPage acquired 49% of multinational drama and film production company Kross Pictures for 5.8 billion won.

In March 2021, KakaoPage Corp. and Kakao M merged into a company named Kakao Entertainment, while having its own representative system under the name "Page Company" there.

In the media
In 2017, actor Park Bo-gum became KakaoPage's first brand ambassador and has since appeared in print, digital and visual media advertisements for the brand.

See also
 Kakao Webtoon
 Piccoma

References

External links
 Kakaopage(Korea) 
 kakaopage(Indonesia)

Android (operating system) software
IOS software
Cross-platform software
Communication software
Kakao
Webtoon publishing companies